National Museum of Science may refer to

Science Museum, London
National Museum of Nature and Science, Tokyo, Japan
National Science Museum, South Korea
Israel National Museum of Science, Technology, and Space

See also
 National Museum of Science and Technology (disambiguation)